Anytime is an album by American country music singer Eddy Arnold. It was released in 1956 by RCA Victor. With the advent of long-playing albums, RCA reissued an expanded version of Arnold's 1952 two-record set. The album collects 12 of Arnold's hit from his early years, including seven records that were number one hits.

AllMusic gave the album a rating of four-and-a-half stars.

Track listing
Side A
 "Bouquet of Roses"
 "It's a Sin"
 "That's How Much I Love You"
 "Don't Rob Another Man's Castle"
 "Rockin' Alone (In a Rocking Chair)"
 "Molly Darling"

Side B
 "I'll Hold You in My Heart (Till I Can Hold You in My Arms)"
 "A Heart Full of Love (For a Handful of Kisses)"
 "Anytime"
 "Texarkana Baby"
 "Will the Circle Be Unbroken?"
 "Who at My Door Is Standing"

References

1956 albums
RCA Victor albums
Eddy Arnold albums